Máramaros County was an administrative county (comitatus) of the Kingdom of Hungary. Its territory is now in north-western Romania and western Ukraine. The capital of the county was Máramarossziget (present-day Sighetu Marmației).

Geography

Máramaros county shared borders with the Austrian crownlands Galicia (now in Poland and Ukraine) and Bukovina (now in Romania and Ukraine) and the Hungarian counties Bereg, Ugocsa, Szatmár, Szolnok-Doboka and Beszterce-Naszód. It was situated on both sides of the river Tisza, and in the Carpathian mountains. Its area was 9,716 km2 around 1910.

History
The first mention of the region in the written sources is from 1199 ("cum in Maramorisio tempore venationis venatum ivissemus"). In the 13th century, it was almost uninhabited or very scarcely inhabited. In 1343, the region was granted to a small Romanian nobility. The region was reorganized to Máramaros county in the 14th century. The growth of its population started when the five crown cities (Máramarossziget, Hosszúmező, Huszt, Técső, Visk) were founded in the same century. In 1920, after the Treaty of Trianon, the northern part of the county became part of newly formed Czechoslovakia (Subcarpathian Rus'). The southern part (including Sighetu Marmației) became part of Romania.

The northern part was returned to Hungary by the annexation of the remainder of Carpathian Ruthenia after Czechoslovakia ceased to exist in 1939, however the redeemed territories of the former county remained separate from the administrative branch office of Máramaros. After the Second Vienna Award, the rest of the county became part of Hungary as well and Máramaros County was recreated on this territory, with Máramarossziget as capital. Afterwards, the northern part of Máramaros county along with the administrative branch offices of Máramaros became part of the Soviet Union, Ukrainian SSR, Zakarpattia Oblast. Since 1991, when the Soviet Union split up, the Zakarpattya region is part of Ukraine.

The southern part of the county is now part of the Romanian county Maramureș.

Demographics

Subdivisions

In the early 20th century, the subdivisions of Máramaros county were:

Notes

References

States and territories established in 1940
States and territories disestablished in 1920
States and territories disestablished in 1945
Counties in the Kingdom of Hungary
Maramureș
History of Carpathian Ruthenia